Cú Chuimne (died 747 AD) was a monk and scholar of Iona. Cú Chuimne, along with Ruben of Dairinis, was responsible for the great compendium known as Collectio canonum Hibernensis (Irish collection of Canon law), which is the first systematic western collection of canon law.

Cú Chuimne is credited with composing the hymn to the Virgin Mary Cantemus in omni die. This hymn is one of the earliest pieces of evidence for devotion to Mary in the Irish church and is described by James F. Kenney as ‘the finest example extant of Hiberno-Latin versification’. His obit in the Annals of Ulster refers to him as sapiens (learned), and quotes a short Old Irish poem that is humorously descriptive of his somewhat eclectic career:

Cú Chuimne in youth
read his way through half the truth.
He let the other half lie
while he gave women a try.
Well for him in old age.
He became a holy sage.
He gave women the last laugh.
He read the other half.

Of which Dáibhí Ó Cróinín recently remarked: "We are not told which he preferred."

Sources
 Die irische Kanonensammlung, ed. Hermann Wasserschleben. Leipzig, 1885.
 Breen, Aidan. "Some seventh-century Hiberno-Latin texts and their relationships."  Peritia 3 (1984)": pp. 204–14.
 Ó Crónín, Dáibhí. "Hiberno-Latin Literature to 1169." In A New History of Ireland, volume one, 2005.

External links
 http://www.ucc.ie/celt/published/L400002/index.html

747 deaths
Irish scribes
Medieval Irish musicians
8th-century Latin writers
Irish Christian monks
8th-century Irish writers
8th-century Christian monks
Medieval Irish poets
Medieval European scribes
Year of birth unknown
Irish male poets
Irish Latinists